Bakersfield, California, held a general election for mayor on June 3, 2008. It saw the reelection of incumbent mayor Harvey Hall.

Since Hall obtained a majority in the initial round of voting, no runoff was necessitated.

Results

References 

Bakersfield
Mayoral elections in Bakersfield, California
Bakersfield